Michael Martyn (19 January 1936 – 26 November 2017) was an English professional rugby league footballer who played in the 1950s and 1960s.

Background
Martyn was born in Leigh, Lancashire, England, and he died aged 81 in Warrington, Cheshire, England.

Playing career

Club career
Martyn was a one club man spending his entire career at Leigh. After signing for the club in 1952 he made his senior début in 1954 and played 329 for the club becoming the club's all-time leading try scorer with 189 before retiring in 1967.

Whilst at the club he played in two Lancashire Cup finals, the first in the 1955–56 Final as Leigh beat Widnes 26–9 at Central Park, Wigan on 15 October 1955. The second was a 4–15 defeat by St. Helens in the 1963–64 Final at Knowsley Road, St. Helens on Saturday 26 October 1963.

Martyn topped the try scoring table for Leigh in five seasons; 1957–58, 1958–59, 1960–61, 1962–63 and 1963–64. He was awarded a testimonial match in 1963.

International honours
Martyn was selected for the 1958 Great Britain Lions tour of Australia and New Zealand and while he only played in one test match against Australia on the tour he did score 23 tries in representative games on the tour. A second test appearance against Australia followed during the 1959–60 Kangaroo tour to Britain.

With an appearance for the Rugby League XIII against France in 1966 he made 24 representative appearances.

Notable relatives
Mick Martyn was the elder brother of the rugby league footballer Tommy Martyn, and the uncle of the rugby league footballer Tommy Martyn.

References

1936 births
2017 deaths
English rugby league players
Great Britain national rugby league team players
Leigh Leopards players
Rugby league players from Leigh, Greater Manchester
Rugby league second-rows
Rugby League XIII players